Amnesty (I), also titled Amnesty I and sometimes referred to as Amnesty, is the fourth and final studio album by electronica duo Crystal Castles, released on August 19, 2016, on Fiction Records and Casablanca Records. It is their first album since the departure of previous frontwoman Alice Glass in 2014, and the first to feature new vocalist Edith Frances. It is also their first album not titled after their band name. Amnesty is also the band's shortest album to date, even with the extra runtime on the physical version. The album received lukewarm reviews by music publications, who criticized the album for having an outdated sound and not being as inspired as their past works.

Release and promotion
On April 15, 2015, Ethan Kath shared a new track titled "Frail" on SoundCloud, writing 'this is Edith on vocals'. The track was released commercially to digital retailers a month later on May 11. Kath shared another track titled "Deicide" on July 2 on SoundCloud, later seeing a commercial digital release on July 10. "Deicide" was later revealed to be a demo for the outro track on Amnesty (I), "Their Kindness Is Charade". In late November 2015, Edith Frances played her first show as the other half of Crystal Castles in South Africa.

On February 29, 2016, the band revealed that they aimed to release the album sometime spring of that year, and confirmed that the 2015 SoundCloud demos "Frail" and "Deicide" would make appearances on the record. For unknown reasons, the record arrived late summer instead of spring 2016.

In the last week of June 2016, the track "Concrete" was leaked on Korean website MNet. With the Concrete leak, fans discovered information about the album via Shazam, such as the title, track list, and cover art. Although the Shazam track list was not in order and the release date was unknown, Amazon Germany accidentally leaked the ordered track list and release date before the album was officially announced on July 11, 2016. The track Concrete was later released as a single on July 6 with an accompanying video on the same day on YouTube. On June 29, the band previewed a new track "Femen" with a teaser of the music video showing birds caught and struggling in mist nets via Vimeo. On July 11, the band officially announced the new record, Amnesty (I) along with its cover art and track list while also premiering a new single, "Char", as Annie Mac's Hottest Record on BBC Radio 1. The single and pre-order for the album were made available a day later on July 12. The fourth pre-order single "Fleece" was made available on August 16 at the band's iTunes page. A CD rip of the album, including the bonus track "Kept", leaked online the same day. The band released "Sadist" on August 18, 2016, via their YouTube channel, followed by the official release of the album on August 19, 2016.

The band took a similar approach to their 2008 debut for Amnesty, as they revealed a majority of the tracks on both albums before they released.

Track listing

Notes
 "Femen" samples a choir cover of "Smells Like Teen Spirit" by Scala & Kolacny Brothers. 
 "Kept" samples "Other People" and "New Year" by Beach House, from their 2012 album Bloom.
 "Their Kindness is Charade" contains additional production by Jake Lee, known professionally as witch house artist 'Sidewalks and Skeletons'.

Charts

References

External links
 

2016 albums
Crystal Castles (band) albums
Fiction Records albums
Casablanca Records albums
Witch house (genre) albums